Asura phaeosticta is a moth of the family Erebidae. It is found in the Rwenzori Mountains.

References

phaeosticta
Moths described in 1958
Moths of Africa